Nucleoporin 50 (Nup50) is a protein that in humans is encoded by the NUP50 gene.

The nuclear pore complex is a massive structure that extends across the nuclear envelope, forming a gateway that regulates the flow of macromolecules between the nucleus and the cytoplasm. Nucleoporins are the main components of the nuclear pore complex in eukaryotic cells. The protein encoded by this gene is a member of the FG-repeat containing nucleoporins that functions as a soluble cofactor in importin-alpha:beta-mediated nuclear protein import. Pseudogenes of this gene are found on chromosomes 5, 6, and 14. Two transcript variants encoding different isoforms have been found for this gene.

Interactions
NUP50 has been shown to interact with KPNB1 and CDKN1B.

References

Further reading

Nuclear pore complex